Saint-Adelphe is a Parish municipality of Quebec, Canada, located in the Mékinac Regional County Municipality, in the Batiscanie area (except watershed Charest river, located in the East) and in the administrative region of Mauricie. The territory of the municipality was part of the lordship of Sainte-Anne which was owned by Mr. John Hale, and Mr. Price.

The magnificent Batiscan river in the north-south bisects the town. The main village developed on the east side of the river. In the story, on the west bank a small village formed around covered bridges spanning the Batiscan River and Pierre-Paul River.

Forestry and agriculture were the two main drivers of the economy of the 19th and 20th century. At the end of the 20th century, many SMEs (small and medium size enterprises) are located there. Since the mid-20th century, the resort has expanded significantly.

Demographics 

Population trend:

Mother tongue:
 English as first language: 4%
 French as first language: 95%
 English and French as first language: 0%
 Other as first language: 1%

Toponymy

In 1885, the settlers, who came to most of Saint-Stanislas of the two Batiscan riversides, agreed to ask the bishop to erect a Catholic Parish. At the founding of the parish of Saint-Adelphe, canonically erected in 1885, Louis-François Richer Laflèche, Bishop of Trois-Rivières wanted to pay tribute to the priest of Sainte-Anne-de-la-Pérade (1852-1882), Edward Louis-Adolphe Dupuis (1823-1893), who had marked the location of the church.

Considering that the Roman martyrology not count Saint-Adolphe, he chose Saint-Adelphe, bishop and confessor, whose religious festival is celebrated on 29 August, and whose name differs only by a vowel. This explanation, advanced by Pierre-Georges Roy, seems ill explain whereas at least one saint named Adolphe Adolf of Osnabrück (1216-1224).

The legendary Batiscan River crosses the territory of the municipality from north to south. This river is recognized as a key passage to the hinterland in Native history.

According to the French explorer Samuel de Champlain, Batiscan designation comes from an "important Indian captain." Different authors attribute the origin of the name Batiscan various interpretations, all of Indian origin "haze" or "crushed bone", "dried meat" and "rushes to the mouth."

The Post Office is itself designated since 1891 under the name of "Saint-Adelphe-de-Champlain". Saint-Adelphe was formerly known as "Pierre-Paul" sector, the name of a tributary of the Batiscan.

History 
Jeanot designated as Indian in the 1861 census of Saint-Stanislas, was one of the first residents of Saint-Adelphe. His residence was located nearby the Manitou Falls on the banks of the Batiscan River, at the limit of Saint-Stanislas and Saint-Adelphe. This sector is also the old limit of two lordship: Sainte-Anne and Batiscan. A few years later, a dozen pioneer families are established in the area. In the 1860s, a few pioneer families had settled in this area whose name was Father: Asselin, Baillargeon, Baribeau, Carpentier Charest, Gervais, Lafontaine, Lambert said Lavigueur Brouillet, Thivierge and Veillette.

During the civil foundation in 1891, the parish of Saint-Adelphe has 56 established families (in addition surnames identified in the 1860s): Ayotte, Boisvert, Bordeleau, Brosseau, Cardinal, Cossette, Side, Francoeur, Gauthier, Germain, Hamelin, Mongrain, Roberge, Sauvageau, St-Arneault, Tiffault. Subsequently, families Douville, Gagnon, Plourde and Trépanier came to settle there.

The ice bridge between Saint-Adelphe and Saint-Stanislas was in operation until the snow removal of intermunicipal roads (around 1949), or until shortly after the Second World War.

Municipal chronology

The civic erection of the parish of Saint-Adelphe was formalized on July 2, 1891. At that time, 56 families were registered in the parish.
 1891 (July 2) - Civil Erection of the municipality of Saint-Adelphe. The territory assigned to this new entity has 186 acres and 5 perches in front to a depth of 216 acres. The first Council meeting was held on September 21, 1891 and first mayor was the Narcisse Roberge.

In 1893, a tray is made to connect the two banks of the Batiscan River at a cost of $30. The ferry fare is fixed at $0.80 per family for one year and $0.10 per car for non-subscribers and non-residents or $0.01 per pedestrian.

 In 1912, construction of the first aqueduct in the village galvanized iron.
In 1912, PN Chaillez of Saint-Stanislas has built a first toll bridge on the Batiscan River.

 1923 - Arrival of electricity. The municipality had adopted the regulation on the sale and the April 3 192L electricity service.
 1924 - Construction of the new covered bridge (wooden) the Batiscan River with a length of 338 feet, with a single central pillar for $16000. This covered bridge included a pedestrian sidewalk on the southeast side.
 1925 - Construction of new wooden covered bridge on the Pierre-Paul River, almost at its mouth which empties into the Batiscan River.
 1927 - Construction of a building for fire pumps, nozzles, tank suits. It was erected on the rue de la Chapelle, then was rebuilt on Main Street.
 1929 - Founding of the People's Fund.
 1937 - The covered bridge on the Batiscan River is the subject of extensive repairs.
 1965 - Construction of the cement bridge on the Batiscan River.
 1968 (November) - Covered Bridge on the Batiscan River is demolished.

Religious chronology 

 1885 (April 23) - Canonical erection of the parish of Saint-Adelphe by decree of Bishop Louis-François Richer Laflèche.
 1889 - Construction of the first chapel and the first rectory, under the direction of Father Michael E. Jannelle, pastor of Sainte-Thècle. These buildings were built on the east side of the Batiscan River, on the site of the actual cemetery.
 1890 - Arrival of the first resident priest is Father Joseph-Marie Gouin. During the previous five years, the priests of Sainte-Thècle, Quebec and Saint-Stanislas had served the parish of Saint-Adelphe.
 1914 - End of the first sod for the construction of the present church.
 1936 - beautification of the grounds of the church under the pastor Ferron.
 January 1, 2018 - Creation of the new "fabrique" of the parish of Saint-Coeur-de-Marie, merging the factories of Notre-Dame-des-Anges, Saint-Éloi-les-Mines, Saint-Rémi-du-Lac-aux-Sables, St. Leopold of Hervey-Junction, St. Thecla and St. Adelphe.

Slogan
"Faithful with his duty"

Further reading 
 "Vie municipale à Saint-Adelphe (Municipal Life in Saint.Adelphe) 1891-1991" by Thérèse Lafontaine, coordinator and editor. Publisher: Municipal Corporation of St.Adelphe. 327 pages. Printed in 1991 in French. Shawinigan, Pâquet Advertising. Recherchistes: Céline Perron et Jo-ann Simard; Lucie Leduc, secrétaire; Jo-ann Simard, dessins. Conception graphique: Publicité Paquet inc.
 "''Le rang Saint-Joseph à Saint-Adelphe (The Row Saint.Joseph in Saint.Adelphe)" by Thérèse Lafontaine. Published in 2012.
 "Répertoire des baptêmes de la paroisse de Saint-Adelphe (Directory of baptisms of the parish of Saint.Adelphe)". Published in 1984 in French by the "Société historique de Saint-Adelphe" (Historical Society of Saint.Adelphe). Part 1: the years 1890-1944; part 2: 1945-1979.
 "Répertoire des mariages de St-Adelphe (Directory of marriages of St.Adelphe)". Published in 1984 in French by the "Société historique de Saint-Adelphe" (Historical Society of Saint.Adelphe). Part 1: the years 1890 to 1924; part 2: 1925-1979. 
 "Répertoire des sépultures de la paroisse de St-Adelphe (Directory of burial in the parish of St.Adelphe)". Published in 1984 in French by the "Société historique de Saint-Adelphe" (Historical Society of Saint.Adelphe). Part 1: 1890 to 1924; part 2: 1925-1979. 
 "Histoire de Saint-Adelphe à travers sa vie scolaire'' (History of Saint.Adelphe through its school life)" by Gaétan Veillette and Jacques Thiffault. Editions of "Bien Public"(Public Affairs). October 1978. 131 pages. Published in French.

See also 
 Batiscan River
 Batiscanie
 Pierre-Paul River
 Charest River
 Saint-Prosper
 Saint-Stanislas
 Sainte-Thècle
 Saint-Ubalde
 Mékinac Regional County Municipality
 Lordship of Sainte-Anne-de-la-Pérade
 Lordship of Batiscan

References

External links

 Municipality of Saint-Adelphe:  

Parish municipalities in Quebec
Incorporated places in Mauricie
Mékinac Regional County Municipality